is a passenger railway station in the city of Sodegaura, Chiba Prefecture, Japan, operated by the East Japan Railway Company (JR East).

Lines
Sodegaura Station is served by the Uchibo Line, and lies 24.4 kilometers from the terminus of the line at Soga Station.

Station layout
The station consists of a single island platform serving two tracks, connected to the wooden station building by a footbridge. The station is staffed.

Platforms

History

On May 24, 1919, the line became the Hōjō Line, on April 15, 1929, it became the Bōsō Line, and on April 1, 1933, it became the Bōsōnishi Line. It became part of the Japanese National Railways (JNR) after World War II, and the line was renamed the Uchibō Line from July 15, 1972. The station assumed its present name from March 31, 1974. Sodegaura Station was absorbed into the JR East network upon the privatization of JNR on April 1, 1987.

Passenger statistics
In fiscal 2019, the station was used by an average of 5615 passengers daily (boarding passengers only).

Surrounding area
 
  Sodegaura City Hall

See also
 List of railway stations in Japan

References

External links

 JR East Station information 

Railway stations in Japan opened in 1912
Railway stations in Chiba Prefecture
Uchibō Line
Sodegaura